Hubie White (born January 26, 1940) is a retired American basketball player.  The 6' 3" shooting guard played for West Philadelphia High School in Philadelphia.  He played college basketball for Villanova University from 1959 to 1962.  White earned All-America honors in 1962.  He was a three-time All Big Five player, AP and UPI All-East, and two-time All State.  Villanova retired White's #14 jersey on January 27, 2001.

White played professionally for San Francisco (NBA) in the 1962–63 season, Philadelphia (NBA) 1963–64, Miami (ABA) 1969–70, and Pittsburgh (ABA) 1970–71.

External links
Career college & NBA statistics @ basketballreference.com

1940 births
Living people
All-American college men's basketball players
American men's basketball players
Basketball players from Philadelphia
Harrisburg Patriots players
Miami Floridians players
Philadelphia 76ers players
Pittsburgh Pipers players
San Francisco Warriors draft picks
San Francisco Warriors players
Shooting guards
Villanova Wildcats men's basketball players
Wilkes-Barre Barons players
Wilmington Blue Bombers players